Steel High School may refer to:

Steel High School, Dayton, Ohio 
Byron P. Steele High School, Cibolo, Texas
Marion L. Steele High School, Amherst, Ohio